This article describes the history of Yunnan (Yunnan–Guizhou Plateau), currently a province of the People's Republic of China.

Prehistory
Notable prehistoric finds include the Yuanmou Man, a Homo erectus fossil unearthed by railway engineers in the 1960s and determined to be the oldest known hominid fossil in China.

Neolithic
By the Neolithic period, human settlements existed in the area of Lake Dian, close to modern day Kunming, Yunnan's capital.  The inhabitants used stone tools and constructed simple wooden structures.

The Kingdom of Dian

The Dian culture was distributed around the Lake Dian area and dated, though controversial, between the 6th century BC and the 1st century AD.  The culture is divided into an early and a late phase. Under Emperor Wu, a series of military campaigns were dispatched against the Dian during the southward expansion of the Han dynasty. In 109 BC, the kingdom officially became a vassal state of the Han empire.

Han dynasty 

In 109 BC, Emperor Wu sent General Guo Chang south to Yunnan, establishing the Yizhou commandery. The commandery seat was at Dianchi county (present day Jinning). To expand the burgeoning trade with Burma and India, Emperor Wu also sent Tang Meng to maintain and expand the Five Foot Way, renaming it "Southwest Barbarian Circuit". By this time, agricultural technology in Yunnan had markedly improved. The local people used bronze tools, plows and kept a variety of livestock, including cattle, horses, sheep, goats, pigs and dogs. They lived in tribal congregations, sometimes led by exile Chinese.

In the Records of the Grand Historian, Zhang Qian (d. 113 BC) and Sima Qian (145-90 BC) make references to "Sendhuk", which may have been referring to an Indianised community taking the name from the Indus Valley (the Sindh province in modern Pakistan), originally known as "Sindhu" in Sanskrit. When Yunnan was annexed by the Han dynasty, Chinese authorities also reported a Sendhuk" (Indianised) community living in the area.

In 109 AD, the Han court established Yunnan county, a part of Yizhou commandery. Because the county seat was south of Mount Yun, the county was named "Yunnan" – literally "south of Yun".

Jin dynasty and the Northern and Southern dynasties period
Chinese dynasties of Jin, Liu Song, Southern Qi and Northern Zhou maintain their rules around the commandery in the Kunming area. Southwest Yunnan and the eastern rugged, mountainous areas were still enjoying relative independence, ruled by tribal kings and chieftains with little Chinese influence.

Nanzhao Kingdom 

In 649 AD the chieftain of the Yi Mengshe tribe, Xinuluo, founded a kingdom in the area of Lake Erhai. In the year AD 737, Piluoge united the six zhaos in succession, establishing a new kingdom called Nanzhao.

In 750, Nanzhao invaded the Tang dynasty. In retaliation, the Tang sent an army against Nanzhao in 751, but this army was soundly defeated at Xiaguan.  In 754, another army was sent, this time from the north, but it too was defeated. Bolstered by these successes, Nanzhao expanded rapidly, first into Burma, then into the rest of Yunnan, down into northern Laos and Thailand, and finally, north into Sichuan. In 829, Chengdu was taken; it was a great prize, as it enabled Nanzhao to lay claim to the whole of Sichuan province, with its rich paddy fields.

The Tang dynasty retaliated and by 873, Nanzhao had been expelled from Sichuan, and retreated back to Yunnan. Taking Chengdu marked the high point of the Nanzhao kingdom, and it was a watershed: from then on, the Nanzhao Kingdom slowly declined. n 902, the Nanzhao dynasty was overthrown, and it was followed by three other dynasties in quick succession, until Duan Siping seized power in 937 to establish the Kingdom of Dali.

Dali Kingdom 

Dali was a Buddhist Bai kingdom. Established by Duan Siping in 937, it was ruled by a succession of 22 kings until the year 1253, when it was destroyed by an invasion of the Mongol Empire. The capital city was at Dali. In 1274 the Province of Yunnan was created, and the region has since been incorporated within China.

Yuan dynasty 
The Mongols established regular and tight administrative control over Yunnan. In 1253 Möngke of the Mongol Empire dispatched the prince Kublai (the eventual founder of the Yuan dynasty) to take Yunnan. The Mongols swept away numerous native kingdoms, including the Dali Kingdom. Later Yunnan became one of the ten provinces set up by Kublai. Kublai Khan appointed Turkmen Sayyid Ajjal Shams al-Din Omar governor in Yunnan in 1273. Before that, the area had been ruled by a local king and a Mongol prince under the Great Khan. The Yuan provincial authorities conferred various titles on many native chieftains, who were obliged to pay taxes. When the Mongols were expelled from China proper in 1368, Yunnan was thrown into chaos and anarchy for a number of years. The Ming dynasty defeated the last of the Yuan loyalists in 1381.

Ming dynasty 
The newly proclaimed Ming dynasty did not send armies into Yunnan until 1381. The central government allowed the general Mu Ying, foster son of dynastic founder Zhu Yuanzhang, to set up a hereditary feudatory system in the province. Throughout the Ming, the Mu family developed tremendous influence in Yunnan.

From the end of the 15th century, the Toungoo Dynasty in Myanmar began encroaching on Yunnan. In the 16th century Chen Yongbin, the governor of Yunnan, held back a Myanmar invasion. After the war, he built eight passes along the border in Tengyue subprefecture to mark the demarcation between the two countries.

Qing dynasty 

After the fall of the Ming in northern China, Yunnan became the last Southern Ming regime headed by Zhu Youlang. Supported by rebel loyalists, he persisted in resistance against the Qing conquest even after the Qing capture of Kunming in 1659. Zhu and his men then fled into Myanmar to seek refuge in Ava, but were treated as prisoners. Zhu's armed followers savaged Upper Myanmar in an attempt to rescue him. General Wu Sangui, then still loyal to the Qing, invaded Myanmar in 1662 with a sizable army, and demanded Zhu's surrender. Although he hesitated, King Pye finally decided to hand Zhu over to avoid hostility. Wu Sangui later turned against the Manchus but died in 1678. Yunnan finally fell to the Qing army in 1681.

Pingnan Sultanate 

Waves of conflict between the Muslim Hui people in Yunnan and the Qing government escalated into an all out rebellion in 1856. The rebels in western Yunnan under the leadership of Du Wenxiu became the major military and political center of opposition to the Qing government. They turned their fury on the local mandarins and ended up challenging the central government in Beijing. The rebellion successfully captured the city of Dali, which became the base for the rebels' operations, and they declared themselves a separate political entity from China. The rebels identified their nation as Pingnan Guo and Du Wenxiu was styled Qa´id Jami al-Muslimin ('Leader of the Community of Muslims'), but is usually referred to in foreign sources as Sultan, and ruled 1856 – 26 December 1872. The sultanate reached the high-water mark of their power and glory in 1860.

The Sultanate's power declined after 1868. The Chinese Imperial Government had succeeded in reinvigorating itself. By 1871, it was directing a campaign for the annihilation of the obdurate Hui Muslims of Yunnan. Though largely forgotten, the bloody rebellion caused the deaths of up to a million people in Yunnan. Many adherents to the Yunnanese Muslim cause were persecuted by the imperial Manchus. Wholesale massacres of Yunnanese Muslims followed.

For a period of perhaps ten to fifteen years following the collapse of the Panthay Rebellion, the province's Hui minority was widely discriminated against by the victorious Qing, especially in the western frontier districts contiguous with Burma. During these years the refugee Hui settled across the frontier within Burma gradually established themselves in their traditional callings – as merchants, caravaneers, miners, restaurateurs and (for those who chose or were forced to live beyond the law) as smugglers and mercenaries and became known in Burma as the Panthay.

Republican China 

Following the collapse of the Qing dynasty in 1911, Yunnan came under the control of local warlords, who had more than the usual degree of autonomy due to Yunnan's remoteness.  They financed their regime through opium harvesting and traffic.

In Second Sino-Japanese War, Yunnan served as, among other things, a home base for the Flying Tigers and a refuge for people, especially university faculty and students, from the east.  These had originally retreated to Changsha, but as the Japanese forces were gaining more territory they eventually bombed Changsha in February 1938. The 800 staff faculty and students who were left had to flee and made the 1,000-mile journey to Kunming. It was here that the National Southwest Associated University (commonly known as Lianda) was established. In these extraordinary wartime circumstances for eight years, staff, professors and students had to survive and operate in makeshift quarters that were subject to sporadic bombing campaigns by Japan. There were dire shortages of food, equipment, books, clothing and other essential needs, but they did manage to conduct the running of a modern university. Over those eight years of war (1937–1945), Lianda became famous nationwide for having and producing many, if not most, of China's most prominent academics, scholars, scientists and intellectuals.  Both of China's only Nobel laureates in physics studied at Lianda.

People's Republic of China 

The establishment of the PRC brought gradual but definite consolidation to China's southwestern borders, solidifying what were previously murky claims to various regions.

For example, Colonial French and English had been active at sites in neighbouring northern Laos, Vietnam and Burma, and even inside of modern Yunnan at sites like Tengchong and Gejiu.  In fact, between 1904 and 1909 the French had built the long Sino-Vietnamese Railway which ran from Hanoi to Kunming via Hekou, with an offshoot to Gejiu.  The English tried to match the French effort with the Yunnan–Burma Railway, but failed to complete it prior to the outbreak of war, with the project ultimately abandoned.

The PRC also saw a bitter Sino-Vietnamese War fought along Yunnan's south eastern border, which was properly demarcated only on 23 February 2009, with renewed agreements taking effect as late as 14 July 2010.

In the southern region of Xishuangbanna, little or no Han dominance was felt as late as the end of the 19th century.  This is illustrated by Otto E. Ehlers' (1855–1895) account of his walk from Rangoon to Jinghong, recording upon his arrival that the annual Chinese tribute mission from northerly Simao was in town and, whilst they were happy to allow him to stay on the south of the Mekong river, he was not to be lent assistance in crossing over.  He had no trouble crossing with the aid of a local, regardless.

References

Further reading 
 Giersch, Charles Patterson (2006): Asian borderlands. The transformation of Qing China's Yunnan frontier. Cambridge, Massachusetts: Harvard Univ. Press.
 Yang, Bin (2009): Between winds and clouds. The making of Yunnan (second century BCE to twentieth century CE). New York, Chichester: Columbia University Press.

External links
雲南・東南アジアに関する漢籍史料